Rayan Philippe (born 23 October 2000) is a French professional footballer who plays as a forward for Luxembourger club Swift Hesperange.

Career
Philippe made his professional debut with Dijon in a 2–0 Ligue 1 loss to Bordeaux on 24 August 2019.

On 29 August 2021, he joined Swift Hesperange in Luxembourg.

References

External links
 
 
 
 

2000 births
Living people
Footballers from Nice
Association football forwards
French footballers
France youth international footballers
Rapid de Menton players
Dijon FCO players
SC Toulon players
AS Nancy Lorraine players
FC Swift Hesperange players
Ligue 1 players
Ligue 2 players
Championnat National players
Championnat National 3 players
French expatriate footballers
Expatriate footballers in Luxembourg
French expatriate sportspeople in Luxembourg